"He's a Pirate" is a 2003 track composed by Klaus Badelt and Hans Zimmer for the 2003 Disney film Pirates of the Caribbean: The Curse of the Black Pearl. It is featured on the soundtrack album of the film and is used at the beginning of the credits for the film.

The track has been subject to a number of remix versions collected in an EP titled Pirates Remixed and separate singles released notably by Tiësto in 2006 and by Rebel in 2014. Renditions of the track were also used for the credits of the four Pirates sequels.

The track, cut and altered for time, has been used as theme music by the Tampa Bay Buccaneers for pre-game and time-out sequences at home games at Raymond James Stadium.

Production
Hans Zimmer was initially asked to score the film, but he gave the assignment to his colleague Klaus Badelt since he was working on another project at that time. However, he ended up writing most of the themes, including "He's A Pirate".

Pirates Remixed EP

Pirates Remixed is an EP that features remixes by Tiësto and other DJs of the song "He's a Pirate" composed by Klaus Badelt for the Disney movie Pirates of the Caribbean: The Curse of the Black Pearl. It was made available for download exclusively through iTunes, via the official EP website.

Walt Disney Records also has a promotional CD which contains nine tracks total, including two tracks from the original scores, and radio edits. EMI also was licensed to create a CD which contained the Tiësto remixes and the Jack Theme Suite from the second film's score. Along with the digital download and the limited CD releases, it was also released as a promotional copy on vinyl. The vinyl version came under the name Pirates of the Caribbean: Dead Man's Chest Remixes and contained a remix not available on either the digital download or the CD versions.

Tiësto also released an alternative "He's a Pirate" remix as a bonus track on his Elements of Life album.

Formats
The digital download had 6 tracks that included a radio edit, and remixes, whereas the Walt Disney Records CD had 9 tracks including 7 track versions of "He's a Pirate" in addition to 2 tracks, the original score of "Swords Crossed" and "Jack Theme Suite". Walt Disney Records also released a promotional vinyl version with 6 tracks including five of "He's a Pirate".

Digital download
 He's a Pirate (Radio Edit Remix) - 4:10 
 He's a Pirate (Tribal Treasure Remix) - 8:17
 He's a Pirate (Pelo Verde Remix) - 5:17
 He's a Pirate (Pete 'n' Red's Jolly Roger Trance Remix) - 5:44
 He's a Pirate (Chris Joss Ship Ahoy Tribal Remix) - 4:46
 He's a Pirate (Orchestral Remix) - 7:04

Walt Disney Records CD
 He's a Pirate (Tiësto Radio Edit) - 4:05
 He's a Pirate (Pete 'n' Red's Jolly Roger Radio Edit) - 3:11
 Swords Crossed (Original Score) - 3:17
 He's a Pirate (Friscia & Lamboy Tribal Treasure Mix) - 8:17
 He's a Pirate (Pelo Verde Mix) - 5:14
 He's a Pirate (Tiësto Remix) - 7:03
 He's a Pirate (Pete 'n' Red's Jolly Roger Trance Mix) - 5:43
 He's a Pirate (Chris Joss Ship Ahoy Tribal Mix) - 4:43
 Jack Theme Suite (New Score Cue from Pirates of the Caribbean: Dead Man's Chest) - 6:11
 Jack's theme suite - 55.54

Walt Disney Records promotional vinyl
 He's a Pirate (Tiësto Remix) - 7:03
 He's a Pirate (Friscia & Lamboy Tribal Treasure Mix) - 8:16
 He's a Pirate (Pete 'n' Red's Jolly Roger Trance Mix) - 5:43
 Swords Crossed (NK & Funky Junction Cursed Square Trubolenza) - 6:24
 He's a Pirate (Pelo Verde Mix) - 5:14
 He's a Pirate (Chris Joss Ship Ahoy Tribal Mix) - 4:43

EMI Records CD
 He's a Pirate (Tiësto Radio Edit) - 4:05
 He's a Pirate (Tiësto Remix) - 7:03
 He's a Pirate (Tiësto Orchestral Remix) - 7:03
 Jack Theme Suite (New Score Cue from Pirates of the Caribbean: Dead Man's Chest) - 6:11

Tiësto Remixes

"He's a Pirate - Tiësto Remixes" was a separate 2006 single release by Tiësto considered a dance release version of Klaus Badelt's "He's A Pirate" and commercially successful in various European Singles' Charts after release on EMI Records.

Track list
"He's A Pirate" (Tiësto Radio Edit) (4:05)
"He's a Pirate" (Tiësto Remix) (7:03)
"He's a Pirate" (Tiësto Orchestral Remix) (7:03)
"Hans Zimmer - Jack Theme Suite" (New Score Cue from "Pirates of the Caribbean Dead Man's Chest) (6:11)

Appearances
The remixes have also been included in a number of compilations including:
Tiësto's Trance Night – Winter Edition 2007 
Tiësto's Trance 2007 – The Hit-Mix
Tiësto's Elements of Life (2007)

Charts

Year-end charts

Rebel version

In 2014, the Belgian DJ and music producer Rebel made a remix under the title "Black Pearl (He's a Pirate)" featuring Sidney Housen becoming a hit for Rebel in France, Belgium and Switzerland.

Weekly charts

Year-end charts

References

External links
 
 Internet Archive version

2005 singles
2006 singles
2006 EPs
2014 singles
2005 songs
Songs written for films
Pirates of the Caribbean music
2006 remix albums
Remix EPs
Walt Disney Records EPs
Walt Disney Records remix albums
EMI Records singles
ITunes-exclusive releases
Disney songs
Internet memes